Broadmoor Golf Club is a private golf club in the northwest United States in Seattle, Washington, founded in 1924 and opened for play in April 1927. It is located in the Broadmoor neighborhood of Seattle, just south of the University of Washington and west of Lake Washington.

Broadmoor is a tribute to designer/builder A. Vernon "Mac" Macan, a leading golf course architect of the time. Born in Dublin, Ireland, in 1882, Macan was a highly educated man, attending Shrewsbury and studying law at Trinity College. In 1908, Macan emigrated to Canada, and was the architect for many golf courses in British Columbia and the northwestern U.S., including Royal Colwood, Inglewood, Fircrest, Columbia Edgewater, Hillcrest, and Colwood National.

Golf history hosted at Broadmoor over the years includes the $10,000 Seattle Open in 1945 with Byron Nelson, Jug McSpaden, Ben Hogan, and Sam Snead. Nelson took the tournament with a new world's record of 259 for 72 holes, 21 under par, and a victory margin of thirteen strokes. He won a record eighteen tournaments in 1945, including eleven consecutive.

In 1952 at the LPGA Tour's Seattle Weathervane tournament, Betsy Rawls bested Babe Zaharias. In 1954, the 52nd Western Amateur brought Jack Benny, Bing Crosby, and Phil Harris to the course. In 1961, Broadmoor hosted the 13th annual U.S. Girls' Junior and the revival of the Seattle Open, where Dave Marr shot a final round 63 (–7) and birdied the first playoff hole 

With the Seattle World's Fair, the Seattle Open in September 1962 attracted Arnold Palmer, Billy Casper, Tony Lema, Ken Venturi, Dave Hill, Julius Boros, Doug Sanders, along with Hollywood stars Bob Hope, James Garner, Don Cherry, Dennis Morgan and Phil Crosby, and a crowd of 6,000 for the pro-am. The tournament was won that year by 22-year-old rookie Jack Nicklaus, his second victory as a professional, following his playoff win over Palmer at the U.S. Open in June. Nicklaus had won $50,000 in the exhibition World Series of Golf the week before, and won in Portland the following week for his third tour title. The Seattle Open was held for the last time at Broadmoor in 1964 and Billy Casper claimed the winner's circle; the tournament continued for two more years, at Inglewood and Everett.

The U.S. Women's Amateur in 1974 brought winner Cynthia Hill (of the Broadmoor Golf Club in Colorado), Nancy Lopez, and Amy Alcott.

More recently, Broadmoor hosted the Pac-10 championship in 1989 and 1999, when Paul Casey of Arizona State lowered the course record to 60 (–10). The current record was set sixteen years later in 2015 by Seattle native Fred Couples, with a round of 59 (–11) in August.

Summary of Tournaments Hosted

References

External links

Sports venues in Seattle
Golf clubs and courses in Washington (state)
1924 establishments in Washington (state)
Golf clubs and courses designed by A. V. Macan